Ahn Dae-hee (born March 31, 1955) is a prosecutor once nominated Prime Minister of the Republic of Korea. President Park Geun-hye nominated for the post of Prime Minister on 22 May 2014, but Ahn withdrew his nomination.

Biography
Ahn was a state prosecutor for 26 years until 2006. He was named Supreme Court justice by President Roh Moo-hyun in 2006. He joined the 2012 presidential campaign of Park Geun-hye. President Park has appointed Ahn on 22 May 2014 as Prime Minister and successor to his predecessor Jung Hong-won, but Ahn withdrew.

Education
 Graduated, Kyunggi High School
 Bachelor of Arts in Public Administration, Seoul National University (Dropped-Out)

References

1955 births
Living people
Seoul National University School of Law alumni
20th-century South Korean lawyers
People from Haman County
21st-century South Korean lawyers
Justices of the Supreme Court of Korea